Bruce Rasmussen (born September 29, 1950) was the director of athletics at Creighton University. He was the head coach of the Creighton Bluejays women's basketball team from 1980 to 1992.  From 1992 to 1994, he served as the associate athletics director, before being named the athletics director in 1994.  He presided over the NCAA Men’s Basketball Committee in 2018.

Career 
Rasmussen graduated from the University of Northern Iowa in 1971.

Legacy 
The Rasmussen Fitness and Sports Center, which opened in October 2012, is named after Bruce Rasmussen.  Inducted in 2008, he is a member of the Omaha Sports Hall of Fame. In 2014, he was named Under Armour Athletic Director of the Year.

References

External links
 Creighton profile

1950 births
Living people
American women's basketball coaches
Creighton Bluejays athletic directors
Creighton Bluejays women's basketball coaches
People from Webster City, Iowa
University of Northern Iowa alumni